Golmakan (also Romanized as Golmakān and Gulmakān) is a city in Golmakan Rural District, Golmakan District, Golbahar County, Razavi Khorasan Province, Iran. At the 2006 census, its population was 6,413, in 1,620 families.

References 

Populated places in Chenaran County
Cities in Razavi Khorasan Province